Political party strength in Washington may refer to:

 Political party strength in Washington (state)
 Political party strength in Washington, D.C.